The Lari (alternatively Laari, Laadi, Ladi, Balari or Baladi) is an ethnic group of the Republic of the Congo and the name of the language they speak. A subgroup of the Kongo people, the Lari live in the communes of Brazzaville, the capital; and Pointe-Noire, and within the surrounding Pool Department. This subgroup was born in the 19th century.  where they constitute almost the entire population. There are an estimated 1.2 million Lari living in Congo.

History
The establishment of the capital Brazzaville by the French colonizer near the Kongo settlements led to the merging of several Kongo subgroups into a new group with a new identity. Indeed, towards the end of the nineteenth century, the Ladi (pronunciation: lari or ladi) are people from different Kongo subgroups (subgroups originating from the former province of the Kongo Kingdom « Nsundi »): Sundi, Buende, Manianga, Hangala.

With the rapid commercial and demographic expansion, Ladi (pronunciation: lari or ladi) became the Kongo vernacular between the different branches (Sundi, Manianga, Kongo (or Koongo) ba Nseke), reshaping the Kongo identity, following the colonial railroad. In addition, there is  old neighborhood with the Teke people, which is materialized by matrimonial alliances.

Several hypotheses have been put forward for the origin of the word ladi or lari, but it seems to be taken from the Lulari or Luladi river, a river near Kimpanzu, the village of Malonga Mi Mpanzu alias Bueta Mbongo  or Bweta Mbongo; Boueta Mbongo in French (about 1860–1898). He was a mfumu kanda and mfumu tsi/nsi (clan chief and land chief), of the  Mpanzu and Buende; his people and allies were thus designated bisi Buende, baBuende (in reference to the  Buende/Bwende). Him and  Mabiala ma Nganga (Sundi or Suundi, Nsundi) organized armed resistance against the French colonial settlement from the late 1880s, and then he became the leading figure of the resistance after the death of Mabiala ma Nganga  in 1896. After the death of Bueta Mbongo in 1898, the mfumu (chiefs) signed a surrender in 1899, accepting French authority in the region. In these years, the Buende ethnonym gradually disappeared, giving way to that of Ladi. Thus the Ladis are originally the bisi Buende or baBuende, a Sundi stictosensu and lato sensu subgroup. Later, other Kongos (Haangala, Sundi/Nsundi, etc.) from Nsundi were added and some Tékés who remained in the Pool became part of it.

References
• Content in this edit is translated from the existing French Wikipedia article at :fr:Lari (peuple)

External links
 Laari language, Ethnologue report

Ethnic groups in the Republic of the Congo
Languages of the Republic of the Congo
Languages of Angola